The PBA on Viva TV was a presentation of Philippine Basketball Association games on Intercontinental Broadcasting Corporation by Viva Entertainment after the company absorbed Vintage Sports.

History
In late 1999, Vintage Television was bought by media giant Viva Entertainment. Prior to the acquisition, Vintage Television have signed a three-year broadcast deal with the PBA earlier that year worth 770 million pesos. They defeated GMA Network, in its bid to enter into the sports broadcasting scene following ABS-CBN's coverage of the then-existing Metropolitan Basketball Association.

From 2000 to 2001, Viva TV broadcast PBA games on Sundays, Wednesdays and Fridays with out of town games covered on Saturdays either live, tape-delay or aired days later. In 2002, at Viva's request, the league scheduled its games on Tuesdays and Thursdays with one game from 6–8, and two double-headers on Saturdays and Sundays to accommodate the airing of the local version of two popular game shows that was also produced by them; (The Weakest Link and Who Wants to Be a Millionaire?). This led to a sudden decrease in ratings and the league shifted back its 2001 schedule at the start of the semifinals of the Commissioner's Cup.

Noli Eala and Ed Picson were the main play-by-play commentators from 2000 to 2002. However, Picson left the network at midseason following a fallout between him and the network. He would return to cover PBA games for the PBA on ABC broadcast in 2004.

At the end of the 2002 season, Viva left a significant amount of debt to the league. They tried to bid for a new contract with the league but was defeated by the NBN-IBC consortium.

Viva-TV aired its last PBA games on Christmas Day 2002 during Game 4 of the 2002 All-Filipino Cup between the Coca-Cola Tigers and the Alaska Aces. Incoming commissioner Noli Eala and Tommy Manotoc were the commentators for its last run.

Commentators

Play-by-play
Noli Eala
Mon Liboro
Chino Trinidad
Ed Picson
Benjie Santiago
Anthony Suntay
Boom Gonzalez

Analyst
Quinito Henson
Paolo Trillo
TJ Manotoc
Tommy Manotoc
Ron Jacobs
Yeng Guiao
Leo Isaac
Joel Banal

Courtside reporters & Halftime Hosts
Dong Alejar
Paolo Trillo
Chiqui Roa-Puno
Jannelle So
Benjie Santiago
Charissa Litton
Jackie Simpao
Ronnie Nathanielsz
Pia Arcangel

See also
Philippine Basketball Association
PBA on ESPN 5
List of programs previously broadcast by Intercontinental Broadcasting Corporation

References

Viva TV
Intercontinental Broadcasting Corporation original programming
2000 Philippine television series debuts
2002 Philippine television series endings
Philippine sports television series